Street sign theft occurs when street signs are stolen, to be used as decorations, sold as scrap metal or to avoid obeying the law by claiming later the sign was not there. Although the theft often seems arbitrary, signs with unusual or amusing names tend to be stolen more frequently. Sometimes considered to be a prank by the perpetrators, the theft is often costly and inconvenient (and can possibly be dangerous) for the municipality or agency that owns the sign. In the United States, each street sign generally costs between $100 and $500 to replace.

In law
In most jurisdictions, the theft of traffic signage is treated like any other theft with respect to prosecution and sentencing. If, however, the theft leads to an injury, then the thieves may be found criminally liable for the injury as well, provided that an injury of that sort was a foreseeable consequence of such a theft. In one notable United States case, three young adults were found guilty of manslaughter for stealing a stop sign and thereby causing a deadly collision. This was publicized in the novel Driver's Ed by Caroline B. Cooney.

Prevention

Some jurisdictions place stickers on street signs warning of the legal punishment for their theft. Some cities (e.g. Toronto) use specially designed bolts to attach signs and prevent removal.
With some of the more popular street names such as Liverpool's famous "Penny Lane", authorities gave up the practice of constantly replacing signs and simply resorted to painting the name of the street on the walls. Other jurisdictions offer replica street signs for sale to discourage theft. For route markers or mile markers that contain numbers with suggestive meanings, such as 69, 420, or 666, the number may be changed to avoid sign theft.

Examples

Austria
After frequent thefts of its welcome sign at the town boundary, the Austrian village of Fucking installed theft-resistant signs in 2005. The town changed its name to Fugging in 2020.

Canada
Ragged Ass Road in Yellowknife, Northwest Territories, Canada saw such frequent sign thefts that the city welded the sign to the post and began to sell replica street signs.
De Grassi Street has seen multiple sign thefts over the years because of its connection to the Degrassi teen television franchise. According to the Globe and Mail, twelve signs were stolen in 2000 alone.

Republic of Ireland
Signs are often stolen in Ireland for decorating the walls of Irish pubs around the world: places in County Kerry and sites associated with Michael Collins (such as Béal na Bláth or Clonakilty) are especially popular.

Germany
Due to the heavy metal festival that is named after the place, the small hamlet of Wacken in Northern Germany had to deal with street sign theft.

The Netherlands

All the signs of the Dutch village Maaskantje were stolen since the New Kids comedy sketch show on Comedy Central (which is situated in the village) became popular (in the Netherlands, Belgium and Germany). The municipality of Maaskantje decided not to replace the stolen signs.
In Amsterdam, signs prohibiting the consumption of cannabis were a frequent target of theft, prompting the city to offer replicas of the sign for sale.

Spain
Leganés, Spain dedicated some streets to rock groups like AC/DC, Scorpions, Iron Maiden and Rosendo. The AC/DC sign was stolen days after inauguration. Leganés authorities now offer identical signs for sale.

Sweden

Sweden's distinctive warning sign for moose is noted for its tendency to be stolen, traditionally by German tourists. 
The sign "Grovare 6", pointing to the small village Grovare in Sweden, 6 km from the sign, was often stolen. "Grovare" means "rougher" in Swedish with slightly wrong grammar, and the number 6 is spelt "sex". The new sign says "Grovare 5", even though it is still 6 km.

United Kingdom
The signs on Abbey Road in London, England were often stolen by Beatles fans until the city council mounted them on buildings.
Street signs on Butt Hole Road in England were stolen over time, because of the use of butt hole as a slang term for "anus". The street was eventually renamed Archers Way in 2009.
The village of Shitterton in the United Kingdom saw its welcome sign stolen so often that in 2007 the local council stopped replacing it. The village's residents eventually contributed funds to buy a one-and-a-half-tonne stone slab with the town's name engraved on it as a permanent replacement.

United States
The sign for South Park Street in Lawrence, Kansas has been stolen on several occasions, prompting the city to install theft-proof bolts on the sign.
In 1988, Denver, Colorado began selling replica Corona Street signs after noting the signs were stolen by fans of the beer.
Brickyard Road, Lakeside, Florida. Fans repeatedly stole the road sign because Lynyrd Skynyrd lead singer Ronnie Van Zant was living there before his death in 1977 and his brother, Johnny Van Zant, released an album and single called Brickyard Road in 1990. The county eventually erected a concrete pillar with the street name painted on it, as opposed to a traditional road sign.
State, provincial or federal highways in many countries may face sign theft issues if their route number has popular culture connotations. Numbers especially prone to theft include 69 because of its use as a slang term for simultaneous oral sex, 420 because of its connection to marijuana culture, and 666 because of its association with the Biblical Number of the Beast. Four highways numbered 69 in the United States have been renumbered due to sign theft: Route 69 in New Jersey was renumbered to Route 31 in 1967, State Route 69 in Ohio was renumbered to Ohio State Route 235 in 1968, State Highway 69 in Texas was renumbered to State Highway 112 in 1992, and State Route 69 in Utah was renumbered to State Route 38 in 1994. In addition, officials in Oregon had originally planned to assign the Route 69 designation to the Beltline Highway in Eugene in 2002 but later chose to assign Oregon Route 569 to the route instead.  However, Interstate 69 and US-69 have not been altered. Sign theft was also a factor that led to the renumbering of U.S. Route 666 to U.S. Route 491 in 2003, with a majority of the US 666 signs stolen following the announcement of the renumbering. In addition, County Route 666 in Morris County, New Jersey was renumbered to County Route 665 due to sign theft.
Signs for mile marker 66.6 on the New Jersey Turnpike and Garden State Parkway were frequently stolen due to the Satanic associations with the number 666, prompting officials to consider changing the mile marker to 66.61.
Signs for mile marker 420 along Interstate 70 in Colorado were often stolen due to the marijuana reference, leading the Colorado Department of Transportation to change the mile marker to 419.99. The states of Washington, Idaho, and Florida have also since begun implementing the same solution in response to incidents of "mile 420" sign theft. Idaho replaced mile marker 420 along U.S. Route 95 with 419.9, which is also now used on Interstate 75 in Florida.
Richard Bong State Recreation Area, a state park in Wisconsin, also suffers from sign theft due to the association of the word "bong" with marijuana culture.
U.S. Route 66 in the United States, the subject of a famous 1940s pop song, also sees frequent sign theftsigns are so often stolen that in some places it can be difficult to navigate without knowing the route; furthermore, US 66 signage has not been maintained since the route was decommissioned from the U.S. Highway System in 1985. Instead, some localities rely on route shield pavement markings, which cannot be stolen, to indicate the path of the historic route.
Often in the United States and Canada, the sign for streets called "High St." are stolen, also for its connection to marijuana culture. In an episode of the TV series That '70s Show, several of the characters attempt to steal a High St. sign to give to Steven Hyde for his birthday. This is less common in the United Kingdom, as the term "High Street" is a general term for a town's main shopping district, equivalent to Main Street in North America.
In the southernmost urbanized portion of Anchorage, Alaska, near the Seward Highway, a neighborhood street was called Jackass Lane. The sign at its intersection with Huffman Road, a major thoroughfare in Anchorage, was stolen so frequently during the 1970s and 1980s that the city government renamed the street to Silver Fox Lane.
Signs leading to Bolinas, California were often stolen or wrongly placed by its reclusive residents as a means to make it difficult for tourists to locate the beachside town.
The entry sign in Intercourse, Pennsylvania has been stolen or vandalized on more than one occasion.
In the early 1990s, during the popularity of the movie Batman Returns, many signs that said "Bat Cave Fire District" were stolen around the town of Bat Cave, North Carolina. So many signs were taken that the local volunteer fire department stopped putting them back up.
The sign for Blue Jay Way is said to be the most-stolen street sign in Los Angeles, because of its association with the Beatles song written by George Harrison. The city eventually gave up on a metal sign and painted the street's name on the curb.
Most street signs in West Hartford, Connecticut are mounted on low signposts; the sign for Stoner Drive, however, is mounted high on a utility pole behind a guardrail.
Climax and Hell, Michigan see frequent street thefts due to their names.
Reassurance markers for highway M-22 in Michigan. The highway is nationally popular for its scenery, taking drivers around the Leelanau Peninsula and eastern shore of Lake Michigan. It also runs along the Sleeping Bear Dunes National Lakeshore, named the "Most Beautiful Place in America" by ABC News. A local kiteboarding company also released a line of merchandise with the highway marker on it, branding them as "M-22". Signs along M-22 have been repeatedly stolen since 2003. The Michigan Department of Transportation has replaced stolen signs without the letter "M" on it.
To discourage frequent theft of signs for Harry Baals Drive in Fort Wayne, Indiana, replacement signs now read "H. W. Baals Dr". In 2011, civic leaders also rejected a popular proposal to name a new government building after the former mayor.
BJ Road in Derrick City, Pennsylvania was stolen in a June 2021 incident, presumably for the similarity to the abbreviation for a blowjob.

See also
Manhole cover theft
Street name controversy
Traffic cone

References

External links
Daily Nebraskan article
Bill Breeden article in Owen County news
Kansas State University Collegian article

Theft
Traffic signs